Lot 53 is a township in Kings County, Prince Edward Island, Canada.  It is part of St. George's Parish. Lot 53 was awarded to merchant John Williams, Lieutenant George Campbell, and doctor Richard Huck in the 1767 land lottery. By 1806 the western third was owned by the Earl of Selkirk.

References

53
Geography of Kings County, Prince Edward Island